Volley Menen, officially known for sponsorship reasons as Decospan Volley Team Menen, is a professional men's volleyball club based in Menen which competes in the top flight of Belgian volleyball, Euro Millions Volley League.

References

External links
 Official website 
 Team profile at Volleybox.net

Belgian volleyball clubs
Volleyball clubs established in 1953
1953 establishments in Belgium